Lezhi County is a county of Sichuan Province, China. It is under the administration of Ziyang city.

Climate

Transportation 
Lezhi railway station, currently under construction, will serve the area.

References

County-level divisions of Sichuan
Ziyang